People Are People is a compilation album by British electronic band Depeche Mode, released in North America by Sire Records on 2 July 1984. Sire sensed it needed a new approach in its release policy since the band's 1983 effort Construction Time Again had failed to chart in the US.

Two of the nine tracks were new to the American audience: the latest single "People Are People" and "Now, This Is Fun", the B-side of the non-American 7" "See You".
It was also the first time that the 7" versions of "Leave in Silence" and "Get the Balance Right!" were released in the United States.
The album version of "Love, in Itself" was selected for this compilation, but with a "clean" ending, since on Construction Time Again the track fades into "More Than a Party".

The album was released in July 1984 to relatively little notice. It re-entered the charts and sold better, when the title track became a summer hit in 1985. The album later was certified Gold by the RIAA for shipments of half a million copies. Its success led to the release of yet another compilation album in late 1985: Catching Up with Depeche Mode.

The album was originally released on LP and CD with the band name and album name missing from the album cover. These names were then added to the covers for later re-releases.

A poster for the album appears on the bedroom wall toward the end of John Hughes's Weird Science (1985).

Critical reception

AllMusic were mixed in their reception to the album, rating the album two-and-a-half stars out of five.

Track listing

Release history

Certifications

References

External links
 Album information from the official Depeche Mode web site

Albums produced by Daniel Miller (music producer)
Depeche Mode compilation albums
1984 compilation albums